MinIO is a High Performance Object Storage released under GNU Affero General Public License v3.0. It is API compatible with the Amazon S3 cloud storage service. It can handle unstructured data such as photos, videos, log files, backups, and container images with a current maximum supported object size of 5TB.

History & development 
MinIO's main developer is MinIO Inc, a Silicon Valleybased technology startup founded by Anand Babu Periasamy, Garima Kapoor, and Harshavardhana in November 2014.

MinIO has published a number of benchmarks to disclose both its own performance and the performance of an object storage in general, those include comparisons to an Amazon S3 for Trino, Presto, and Spark as well as throughput results for the S3Benchmark on HDD and NVMe drives.

Re-licensing 
As of April 23 2021 MinIO, Inc submitted a change that re-licensed the project from its previous Apache V2 to GNU Affero Public License Version 3 (AGPLv3). .

Architecture 
MinIO storage stack has three major components: MinIO Server, MinIO Client (a.k.a. mc, which is a command-line client for the object and file management with any Amazon S3 compatible servers), and MinIO Client SDK that can be used by application developers to interact with any Amazon S3 compatible server.

MinIO Server 
MinIO cloud storage server is designed to be minimal and scalable. It is light enough to be bundled along with the application stack, similar to NodeJS, and Redis.

MinIO is optimised for large enterprise deployments, including features like erasure coding, bitrot protection, encryption/WORM, identity management, continuous replication, global federation, and multi-cloud deployments via gateway mode.

MinIO server is hardware agnostic, thus it can be installed both on physical and virtual machines or launched as Docker containers and deployed on container orchestration platforms like Kubernetes.

MinIO Client 
MinIO Client provides an alternative to the standard UNIX commands (e.g. ls, cat, cp, mirror, diff, etc) adding support for an Amazon S3 compatible cloud storage services. It works on Linux, Mac and Windows platforms.

MinIO Client SDK 
MinIO Client SDK provides an API to access any Amazon S3  compatible object storage server. Language bindings are available for Go, Java, Python, JavaScript, Haskell, and languages hosted on top of the .NET Framework.

References

External links 

 
 

Cloud applications
Cloud infrastructure
Cloud storage
Object storage
Free software programmed in Go